Aribusitamunoipirim Emmanuel "Aribim" Pepple (born 25 December 2002) is a professional footballer who plays as a forward for EFL Championship club Luton Town. 

He has previously played for Calgary Foothills, Cavalry FC and for La Liga side Getafe. He made his EFL debut for Grimsby Town during a loan spell in the 2022–23 season. Born in England, he has previously been called up to the Nigeria U17 and Canada U17 teams but failed to earn a cap whilst part of both squads.

Early life
Pepple's father was born in Port Harcourt, Nigeria while his mother was born in London, England.  He was born in Kettering, Northamptonshire in 2002. There he played for youth club Oadby Owls. He moved to Calgary with his family at the age of five.

Club career

Calgary Foothills
Pepple joined the youth programme of PDL side Calgary Foothills at the U10 level, and signed for the first team in 2019. That season, he made eleven league appearances for the Foothills, scoring three goals, and would score another goal in one playoff appearance.

In October 2018, Pepple participated in the Canadian Premier League open trials in Calgary and was the youngest participant countrywide at 15, but nonetheless made the first cut after day one.

Cavalry FC
On 9 August 2019, Pepple signed his first professional contract with Canadian Premier League side Cavalry FC until the end of 2020. On 10 August 2019, he made his debut as a substitute in a 0–0 draw against HFX Wanderers. Pepple would be described as "exactly what the Canadian Premier League is built for", and praised by coaching staff shortly after signing with the club for his physical and mental acuity. In November 2019, Cavalry would confirm that Pepple would return for the 2020 season. 

In October 2020 Cavalry announced Pepple would join Premier League club Sheffield United on a two-week trial. Shortly after the conclusion of his time at Sheffield, he was invited to another Premier League trial, this time with Leicester City. In March 2021, Pepple would officially announce his departure from Cavalry via his Instagram, indicating that he had joined the youth side of La Liga club Getafe.

Getafe
In March 2021, Pepple scored on his debut for Getafe's under-19 team.

Second spell at Cavalry
On 28 April 2022, Pepple returned to Cavalry FC for the 2022 season. In June and July he broke the Canadian Premier League record for longest goalscoring streak, with 6 goals in 5 matches. On July 6, 2022 he was named the CPL's Player of the Month for June after becoming the first-ever player to score in five consecutive league matches. At the time he sat second in the league scoring race with six goals. In July 2022 Cavalry confirmed that they had agreed to a transfer with an undisclosed club, rumoured to be Luton Town, indicating that he would leave the club during the transfer window.

Luton Town
On 2 August 2022, Pepple signed for EFL Championship club Luton Town for an undisclosed fee, returning to his country of birth.

Six days after joining Luton, he was loaned out to Grimsby Town for the 2022–23 season.  The next day on 9 August Pepple made his debut for The Mariners, starting against Crewe Alexandra in a EFL Cup match.

Pepple's loan was terminated by Grimsby on 12 January 2023, with manager Paul Hurst saying "Bim hasn’t had quite as many chances as he would have wished but I’d like to thank him for his time and his efforts with us. You have to remember that it’s a big move, coming over from Canada to Luton and then he very quickly joined us on loan. He’s a young player that hopefully we’ve helped develop to a degree and there’s still a lot more development to come for him". He had made 15 appearances in all competitions, failing to score a single goal.

On 7 February 2023, Pepple was involved in Luton's first team for the first time as he was named as a substitute against former team Grimsby Town in a 3-0 defeat in an FA Cup fourth round replay.

International career
Pepple is eligible to represent Nigeria, England, or Canada after moving to the latter at the age of 5. He was called up to by the Nigeria national under-17 team in preparation for the 2019 FIFA U-17 World Cup but ultimately decided to represent Canada. In October 2019, Pepple was then called to the Canada national under-17 team for friendlies against Argentina and Mexico.

Career statistics

Honours

Club 
Cavalry FC 
 Canadian Premier League Finals 
Runners-up: 2019
Canadian Premier League (Regular season): 
Champions: Spring 2019, Fall 2019

References

External links

Cavalry FC profile

2002 births
Living people
Association football forwards
Canadian soccer players
English footballers
Canadian sportspeople of Nigerian descent
English sportspeople of Nigerian descent
Soccer players from Calgary
Sportspeople from Kettering
English emigrants to Canada
Naturalized citizens of Canada
Calgary Foothills FC players
Cavalry FC players
Luton Town F.C. players
Grimsby Town F.C. players
USL League Two players
Canadian Premier League players
Canadian expatriate soccer players
English expatriate footballers
Expatriate footballers in Spain
Canadian expatriate sportspeople in Spain
English expatriate sportspeople in Spain
Black British sportspeople